The 8th Moscow International Film Festival was held from 10 to 23 July 1973. The Golden Prizes were awarded to the Soviet film That Sweet Word: Liberty! directed by Vytautas Žalakevičius and the Bulgarian film Affection directed by Ludmil Staikov.

Jury
 Sergei Bondarchuk (USSR - President of the Jury)
 Aleksey Batalov (USSR)
 Julio Bracho (Mexico)
 Paulin Soumanou Vieyra (Senegal)
 Jerzy Hoffman (Poland)
 Antonín Kachlík (Czechoslovakia)
 René Clément (France)
 Gina Lollobrigida (Italy)
 Károly Makk (Hungary)
 Kurt Maetzig (East Germany)
 Toshiro Mifune (Japan)
 Tolomush Okeyev (USSR)
 George Stevens (USA)
 Christo Christov (Bulgaria)
 Kamal El Sheikh (Egypt)

Films in competition
The following films were selected for the main competition:

{| class="sortable wikitable" width="85%" cellpadding="5"
|-
!width="30%"| English title
!width="30%"| Original title
!width="25%"| Director(s)
!width="15%"| Production country
|-
| Icheend N' || Icheend N ||Badrahin Sumhu ||Mongolia
|-
| Explosion ||Explozia ||Mircea Drăgan ||Romania
|-
| Tati ||Tati, a garota ||Bruno Barreto ||Brazil
|-
| Days of Betrayal ||Dny zrady ||Otakar Vávra ||Czechoslovakia
|-
| Home Sweet Home ||Home Sweet Home ||Benoît Lamy ||Belgium
|-
| The Thirsties ||Al zamioun ||Mohamed Shukri Jameel ||Iraq
|-
| The Promised Land ||La tierre prometida ||Miguel Littín ||Chile
|-
| Ripe Cherries ||Reife Kirschen ||Horst Seemann ||East Germany
|-
| Tears of Blood ||Und der Regen verwischt jede Spur ||Alfred Vohrer ||West Germany, France
|-
| Empire M || إمبراطور ميم Empire M ||Hussein Kamal ||Egypt
|-
| Cuando quiero llorar no lloro ||Cuando quiero llorar no lloro ||Mauricio Walerstein ||Venezuela
|-
| Copernicus ||Kopernik ||Ewa Petelska, Czesław Petelski ||Poland, East Germany
|-style="background:#FFDEAD;"
| Affection ||Обич, Obich ||Ludmil Staikov ||Bulgaria
|-
| The Dupes || المخدوعون Al-makhdu'un ||Tewfik Saleh ||Syria
|-
| Oklahoma Crude ||Oklahoma Crude ||Stanley Kramer ||United States
|-
| On Own Will ||Swayamvaram ||Adoor Gopalakrishnan ||India
|-
| Plot ||L'Attentat ||Yves Boisset ||France, Italy, West Germany
|-
| Shinobu Kawa ||Shinobu Kawa ||Kei Kumai ||Japan
|-
| The Saplings ||Саженцы, Sazhentsy ||Rezo Chkheidze ||Soviet Union
|-
| Lina's Wedding ||Jentespranget ||Knud Leif Thomsen ||Denmark, Norway
|-
| 17th Parallel, Nights and Days ||Vĩ tuyến 17 ngày và đêm ||Hải Ninh ||North Vietnam
|-
| The Office Picnic ||The Office Picnic ||Tom Cowan ||Australia
|-
| The Battle of Sutjeska ||Sutjeska ||Stipe Delić ||Yugoslavia
|-
| Those Years ||Aquellos años ||Felipe Cazals ||Mexico
|-
| The Triple Echo ||Triple Echo ||Michael Apted ||Great Britain
|-
| Touki Bouki ||Touki bouki ||Djibril Diop Mambéty ||Senegal
|-
| The Assassination of Matteotti ||Il delitto Matteotti ||Florestano Vancini ||Italy
|-
| Photography ||Fotografia ||Pál Zolnay ||Hungary
|-
| The Man from Maisinicu ||El hombre de Maisinicú ||Manuel Pérez ||Cuba
|-style="background:#FFDEAD;"
| That Sweet Word: Liberty! ||Это сладкое слово — свобода!, Eto sladkoye slovo - svoboda!''' ||Vytautas Žalakevičius ||Soviet Union
|-
|}

Awards
 Golden Prize:
 That Sweet Word: Liberty! by Vytautas Žalakevičius
 Affection by Ludmil Staikov
 Golden Prize for Direction: Stanley Kramer for Oklahoma Crude Special Prizes:
 The Assassination of Matteotti by Florestano Vancini
 The Battle of Sutjeska by Stipe Delić
 Those Years by Felipe Cazals
 Silver Prizes:
 Photography by Pál Zolnay
 Copernicus by Ewa Petelska, Czesław Petelski
 Plot by Yves Boisset
 Prizes:
 Best Actor: Sergio Corrieri for The Man from Maisinicu Best Actor: Ramaz Chkhikvadze for The Saplings Best Actress: Tra Giang for 17th Parallel, Nights and Days Best Actress: Ingerid Vardund for Lina's Wedding Diplomas:
 Days of Betrayal by Otakar Vávra
 Home Sweet Home by Benoît Lamy
 The Saplings by Rezo Chkheidze
 Explosion by Mircea Drăgan
 Touki Bouki by Djibril Diop Mambéty
 Prix FIPRESCI: Touki Bouki by Djibril Diop Mambéty
 Special Mention: The Man from Maisinicu'' by Manuel Pérez

References

External links
Moscow International Film Festival: 1973 at Internet Movie Database

1973
1973 film festivals
1973 in the Soviet Union
1973 in Moscow